The Census of population, households and apartments in the Republic of Croatia in 2021 (Croatian: Popis stanovništva, kućanstva i stanova u Republici Hrvatskoj 2021. godine; shortened: Census 2021, Popis 2021.) was the 4th decennial Croatian census. Census Day, the reference day used for the census, was August 31, 2021. This was the first Croatian census to offer options to online self-numeration, in addition to the paper response form used for previous censuses. The census was taken during the COVID-19 pandemic, which affected its administration. The census recorded a resident population of 3,871,833 in the twenty counties and the City of Zagreb, a decrease of 9.64 percent, or 413,056 over the preceding decade. The fall rate was the biggest ever recorded.

Questions and data uses 
The Census collects the following data:

 Population
 surname and first name, gender, personal identification number (PIN), date of birth, marital status; the type of living community in which a person lives; number of live births; place of residence/residence; presence in the census settlement at the time of the Census; reason for absence/presence; time of absence/presence; time of intention of absence/presence; place of absence/place of residence; birthplace; place of residence of the mother at the time of the person's birth; the place from which the person immigrated and the year and reason for immigrating; the foreign country where the person resided for a year or longer, the year of moving to the Republic of Croatia and the reason for staying abroad; citizenship; nationality (national affiliation); mother tongue; religious affiliation; achieved education; attending school/studies; economic activity, position in employment; interest; activities; main sources of livelihood; place of work/school; frequency of returning to the place of residence; means of travel to work/school/study
 Households 
 relative and family composition of the household; type of household; the basis on which the household uses the apartment; area of used agricultural land and ownership of livestock or poultry
 Housing and other residential units
 type and manner of use of the residential unit; apartment ownership; surface area of the apartment; number of rooms in the apartment; kitchen, bathroom and toilet in the apartment; types of installations in the apartment (water supply, sewage, electricity, gas installations); method of heating the apartment; type of energy source; air conditioning; type of building in which the apartment is located; the number of apartments in the building where the apartment is located, the location of the apartment in the building; year of construction of the building in which the apartment is located.

Timeline 
 3 April 2021: Law on the Census of Population, Households and Apartments in the Republic of Croatia in 2021 entered into force
13–26 September 2021: citizens could be registered independently using the census questionnaire in electronic form that was available on the e-Citizens portal, simultaneously listing the household and the apartment in which they live
27 September – 14 November 2021: enumerators used electronic devices to enumerate all census units that were not self-enumerated and controlled the data collected by self-enumeration 
22 September 2022: the final results of the Census 2021 have been published

County rankings 

A population decline was recorded in each of 20 counties and the City of Zagreb. The biggest decline in apsolute numbers was in Osijek-Baranja County, which lost 47,006 inhabitants, while the relative decrease was the strongest in Vukovar-Srijem and Sisak-Moslavina County, at 20.3 and 19.0 percent respectively. The 2020 Petrinja earthquake caused a lot of damage in Sisak-Moslavina County. On the other hand, Zagreb had a large influx of citizens from other parts of Croatia, giving it the smallest relative change.

City rankings 
2021 Census showed decrease of population in all ten biggest cities with Zagreb staying the largest and followed by Split, most populated city in the south, Rijeka, most populated city in the west and Osijek, most populated city in the east.

Population by ethnicity and religion 

Census information with a number of Croats and 22 official recognized minorities of Croatia.

Census also included religion with a connection to nations of Croatia.

Population by first language 
Croatian citizens by first language, including non-official recognized Serbo-Croatian and Croato-Serbian:

Population by sex and age structure 

Sex and age structure of the population of Croatia:

References

2021 censuses
Demographics of Croatia